This Is Stompin' Tom is a 20-minute 1972 Canadian documentary about Stompin' Tom Connors directed by Edwin W. Moody.

Plot
Stompin' Tom Connors is shown from the Horseshoe Tavern in Toronto, then in a small interview, possibly from his home. Connors is also shown accepting his Gold Record award for his Bud The Spud album, which exceeded $100,000 in sales from Canadian Music Sales. Connors discusses where Canadian music is heading, and songs about Canada and where they lack. He talks about his hard life. Autograph signing takes place after a concert, possibly from the Perth Summer Festival.

Production
Filmed by Marlin Motion Pictures, with credit to York University, Perth Summer Festival, and Horseshoe Tavern.

Music
Some live video footage from the Horseshoe Tavern, however this footage is different from the 1973 film Across This Land with Stompin' Tom Connors. Live clips from Connors performing the songs "I've been Everywhere," "Bud the Spud," "Sudbury Saturday Night," "Mule Skinners Blues" and "My Stompin' Grounds" are included.

References

External links
 See 2nd paragraph regarding the existence of Connor's film debut
 Perth Summer Festival
 Horseshoe Tavern

1972 films
Films shot in Ontario
1972 short films
Documentary films about country music and musicians
Canadian short documentary films
1972 documentary films
1970s short documentary films
1970s English-language films
1970s Canadian films